John Richard Smith (born 29 October 1971) is an English retired football striker who spent his entire career in the United States. He is currently the head coach of the Cornell University men's soccer team.

Player
Smith moved to the United States to attend Rollins College where he played on the men's soccer team from 1993 to 1996. He finished his career at Rollins with the school record for career points (142) and career assists (42). He is third on the career goals list with fifty. He was a 1995 Division II Second Team All American and a 1996 Division II First Team All American.

On 1 February 1997, the Columbus Crew selected Smith in the second round (thirteenth overall) of the 1997 MLS College Draft. The Crew released him during the pre-season and he signed with the Orlando Sundogs of the USISL A-League. In July 1997, the Sundogs traded Smith to the Nashville Metros. In 1998, he tied for tenth on the USISL A-League scoring list. In 1999, he played for the Hershey Wildcats and one game for the Rochester Rhinos.

Coaching
In 1998, Smith became an assistant coach with the Cal State Bakersfield soccer program, where he worked with both the men's and women's teams. In March 2006, the University of the Incarnate Word hired Smith as head coach of its men's soccer program. He coached the then-Division II Incarnate Word team for five seasons, until he was hired away to be an assistant coach for the Stanford Cardinal. After Stanford won the 2015 NCAA Division I Men's Soccer Championship, Smith was announced as the head coach of the Cornell Big Red on March 8, 2016.

References

External links
 University of Incarnate Word

Living people
English footballers
English expatriate footballers
English football managers
Hershey Wildcats players
Nashville Metros players
Orlando Sundogs players
Rochester New York FC players
Expatriate soccer players in the United States
Expatriate soccer managers in the United States
Columbus Crew draft picks
A-League (1995–2004) players
Rollins College alumni
Rollins Tars men's soccer players
Cornell Big Red men's soccer coaches
Incarnate Word Cardinals men's soccer coaches
1971 births
Association football forwards
English expatriate sportspeople in the United States
Footballers from Wigan
English expatriate football managers
Cal State Bakersfield Roadrunners men's soccer coaches
Stanford Cardinal men's soccer coaches